James H. Harrington III, professionally known as Jay Harrington, (born November 15, 1971) is an American actor. He is known for his role as the title character in the ABC sitcom Better Off Ted in 2009–2010, and since 2017 as Sgt. David "Deacon" Kay in S.W.A.T.

Early life 
Harrington was born and raised in Wellesley, Massachusetts to Judy and Terry Harrington. He has two brothers, actor Adam and Matt.  As a child, his family spent summers on Cape Cod up the road from The Harwich Junior Theater. He attended Wellesley High School and then studied theater at Syracuse University.

Career 
Harrington has been featured as Dr. Simon O'Keefe on the WB drama Summerland, FBI Special Agent Paul Ryan on FOX's short-lived The Inside, and Steve on NBC's version of Coupling. He appeared in a recurring role on the police drama series The Division. He has also had roles on A.U.S.A., The Shield, Time of Your Life, Private Practice, and Burn Notice.

In 2006, Harrington began appearing as Dr. Ron McCready on the series Desperate Housewives. He starred as Ted Crisp in the comedy series Better Off Ted from March 2009 to January 2010. He had a recurring role in Season 4 of the TV Land comedy series Hot in Cleveland. In 2014, he co-starred on the short-lived USA Network comedy series Benched. In 2017, he had a guest role on Suits as Mark Meadows, Donna's ex-boyfriend. He currently stars as Sergeant II David "Deacon" Kay on S.W.A.T. based on the 1975 television series and 2003 movie of the same name. 

Harrington has appeared in films such as American Reunion (with his character again – like in Desperate Housewives – being called "Dr. Ron"), Whatever It Takes, Anywhere but Here, Catalina Trust, A Little Inside, and Partner(s). He has also performed on stage, starring as Jack in Boy's Life and appearing in the off-Broadway productions Barefoot in the Park and Tony and Tina's Wedding, Harrington is an avid sports fan who plays in the Entertainment League, a private celebrity basketball league (formerly the NBA-E League), and skates for a local amateur ice hockey team.

Filmography

Film

Television

References

External links
 

Male actors from Massachusetts
American male television actors
Living people
Syracuse University alumni
21st-century American male actors
20th-century American male actors
People from Wellesley, Massachusetts
American male film actors
1971 births
Wellesley High School alumni